(386454) 2008 XM is a highly eccentric, sub-kilometer-sized asteroid, with one of the smallest known perihelions among all minor planets. It is classified as near-Earth object of the Apollo group and was discovered on 2 December 2008, by the LINEAR program at Lincoln Laboratory's Experimental Test Site in Socorro, New Mexico, United States.

Orbit and classification 

The asteroid orbits the Sun at a distance of 0.1–2.3 AU once every 16 months (494 days). Its orbit has an eccentricity of 0.91 and an inclination of 5° with respect to the ecliptic. Due to its outstanding eccentricity, it is also a Mercury-crosser, Venus-crosser and Mars-crosser.

Its Earth minimum orbital intersection distance of  corresponds to only 1.9 lunar distances.

Physical characteristics 

According to the survey carried out by the NEOWISE mission of NASA's Wide-field Infrared Survey Explorer, the asteroid measures  meters in diameter and its surface has an albedo of 0.128. As of 2016, the body's composition and spectral type, as well as its rotation period and shape remains unknown.

Naming 

As of 2020, this minor planet remains unnamed.

References

External links 
 Asteroid Lightcurve Database (LCDB), query form (info )
 Asteroids and comets rotation curves, CdR – Observatoire de Genève, Raoul Behrend
 
 
 

386454
386454
386454
386454
386454
20081202